Prison blogs are weblogs written by people held in prison.

Examples of prison blogs
New Zealand
 Tim Selwyn in Mount Eden Prison, New Zealand, ca.2006

 Thailand
 Thai Prison Life a collection of blogs and articles relating the experience of life in Thailand's many overcrowded prisons.
United Kingdom
 Ben's Prison Blog written by Ben Gunn, imprisoned in Sudbury (HM Prison), Derbyshire, England, 2009–2012. Since his release, Ben has continued his blog.
 Anarch*ish* written by Jonathan May-Bowles, serving 6-week sentence for throwing a pie in Rupert Murdoch's face, 2011
 Tommy Sheridan, in Barlinnie prison, Glasgow
 Adam Mac: blogging behind bars written by Adam Mac, imprisoned in Grendon (HM Prison).  He launched the blog in 2013 and has repeatedly had to deal with challenges to his right to blog, years after other prisoners had won this right. 
 Prison UK: an Insider's View written by Alex Cavendish, an ex-prisoner who was released in March 2014. The blog was launched in July 2014.

United States

 "Justice For Sammi" Samantha Lomasney was a young 20-year-old woman who was the victim of domestic violence and the opioid crisis.  A petty crime, a tragic accident, mandatory minimum sentences and politics lead to a sentence of life without parole.  This website tells her story along with commentaries on the justice system.
 Minutes Before Six, a blog and writing community for prisoners in the United States without internet access, who can have their work posted online via volunteers.
 "On the Inside" by Paul Modrowski, an autistic man serving life without parole at Stateville prison in Illinois. He was given a life without parole sentence based on an accountability theory for supposedly lending his car to Bob Faraci who was later acquitted.
 Leigh Sprague's Diary of a Wimpy Con written by Leigh Sprague, currently serving a sentence in a federal prison camp in California for a non-violent white-collar crime.  The posts document his journey through the criminal justice system, from initial charges to indictment to sentencing as well as his experiences in prison and his outspoken views in regard to the prison-industrial complex and mass incarceration
 Behind Prison Walls written by William D. Hastings, serving a 19-year sentence for a violent crime.
 Jon's Jail Journal written by Shaun Attwood 2004 - present Jon's Jail Journal was the world's first prison blog
 Between the Bars (blog), a blog platform for prisoners in the United States without internet access
 The Mind of Maurice Clarett, written by Maurice Clarett while in prison in Ohio, 2008-2010
 Running in Place written by Charlie Engle, serving 21-month sentence in Beaver, West Virginia, for mortgage fraud, 2011–present
 Justin's Blog, written by Justin Paperny while in the privately managed Taft Federal Prison Camp, California, 2008-2009
 Live From Lockdown, blog written by various inmates in the Federal prison system, including highly influential gang-leaders and those held in solitary confinement, Current
 Stories from Inside, written by current and former ADHD Corrections Project participants, 2012–present
 Chelsea Manning's blog
 Moving Forward, blog written by Pyerse Dandridge based on his prison camp journal he wrote in Herlong Federal Prison Camp 2011-2012 and his life after incarceration.
About Prison Camp Life

See also 
 Prison art
 Prison literature
 Prison music

References

Blogs
Prison writings
Imprisonment and detention